Jean-Jacques Clérion (16 April 1637 – 28 April 1714) was a French sculptor who worked mainly for King Louis XIV.

Clérion was born in either Aix-en-Provence or Trets.  For much of his career he worked on the Chateau de Versailles, including many of the famous garden sculptures, such as the "Apollo Fountain".  His admission piece to the Académie française, a 1689 bas relief of Saint James the Less, may be seen in the Louvre.  He also produced a copy of the Kallipygian Venus for Louis XIV's Palace of Versailles in 1686, and a copy of the Medici Venus which may be seen at the Château de Menars.   He died in Paris.

External links
St James the Lesser, 1689, by Jean-Jacques Clérion, Louvre
 Works by Jean-Jacques Clérion on the Louvre collections database

1637 births
1714 deaths
17th-century French sculptors
French male sculptors
18th-century French sculptors
People from Aix-en-Provence
18th-century French male artists